Heaven 97 (97.7 FM) was a radio station in the Cayman Islands in the British West Indies. The station was owned by Christian Communications Association. It aired a Christian Contemporary music format.

The station's final license was issued on December 4, 2003.

This station is no longer in operation.

References

Radio stations in the Cayman Islands
Radio stations established in 1997
Contemporary Christian radio stations
Defunct radio stations in the United Kingdom
Christianity in the Cayman Islands